Joseph Chapman may refer to:

Joseph Chapman (academic), English academic administrator
Joseph Chapman (actor), American film and television actor
Joseph John Chapman (1784–1849), early California resident
Joe Chapman (born 1990), squash player from British Virgin Islands
Joseph A. Chapman (born 1942), president of North Dakota State University
Union Jack (Joseph Chapman), third incarnation of Marvel Comics Union Jack